McChord may refer to:

People
Austin McChord (born 1985), American engineer and businessman
James McChord (1785–1820), American Presbyterian minister 
William McChord Hurt (1950–2022), American actor

Other uses
Joint Base Lewis–McChord, American military force base in Tacoma, Washington
McChord Field, American military base in Pierce County, Washington
McChord Air Museum, air museum in Lakewood, Washington